Cytochrome b-c1 complex subunit 6, mitochondrial is a protein that in humans is encoded by the UQCRH gene.

Its gene product is a subunit of the respiratory chain protein Ubiquinol Cytochrome c Reductase (UQCR, Complex III or Cytochrome bc1 complex; E.C. 1.10.2.2), which consists of the products of one mitochondrially encoded gene, MTCYTB (mitochondrial cytochrome b) and ten nuclear genes: UQCRC1, UQCRC2, Cytochrome c1, UQCRFS1 (Rieske protein), UQCRB, "11kDa protein", UQCRH (cyt c1 Hinge protein), Rieske Protein presequence, "cyt. c1 associated protein", and "Rieske-associated protein".

References

Further reading